Deuterium NMR is NMR spectroscopy of deuterium (2H or D), an isotope of hydrogen. 
Deuterium is an isotope with spin = 1, unlike hydrogen-1, which has spin = 1/2. The term deuteron NMR, in direct analogy to proton NMR, is also used. Deuterium NMR has a range of chemical shift similar to proton NMR but with poor resolution, due to the smaller magnitude of the magnetic dipole moment of the deuteron relative to the proton. It may be used to verify the effectiveness of deuteration: a deuterated compound will show a strong peak in deuterium NMR but not proton NMR.

Deuterium NMR spectra are especially informative in the solid state because of its relatively small quadrupole moment in comparison with those of bigger quadrupolar nuclei such as chlorine-35, for example. This allows for the whole spectrum to be excited with practically achievable pulses of a few microseconds in duration. However, since the natural abundance of 2H is only 0.016%, the sample must usually be isotope enriched with 2H to achieve a sufficiently strong signal. For a given C-D moiety, the quadrupolar splitting in the 2H NMR spectrum depends in a simple way on the angle between the C-D bond and the applied static magnetic field. Thus, 2H NMR can probe orientation distributions in partially ordered deuterated polymers. Changes in C-D bond orientation due to molecular motions have pronounced effects on the spectral line shape. One example is the use of deuterium NMR to study lipid membrane phase behavior.

References

Articles about solid-state deuterium NMR

Nuclear magnetic resonance